Dead Easy may refer to:

 Dead Easy (1970 film), a 1970 Australian film
 Dead Easy (1982 film), a 1982 Australian film